Luongo is a surname. Notable people with the surname include:

 Alfred Leopold Luongo, a former United States federal judge
 Chris Luongo, American former ice hockey player for the Detroit Red Wings
 Gerald Luongo, American Republican Party politician
 Massimo Luongo (1992-), Australian national football team and Queens Park Rangers player
 Roberto Luongo, Canadian ice hockey goaltender for the Florida Panthers

See also
 Lungo, a type of coffee beverage prepared by making espresso with much more water
 Longo, a surname

Italian-language surnames